Tamponade is the closure or blockage (as of a wound or body cavity) by or as if by a tampon, especially to stop bleeding.
Tamponade is a useful method of stopping a hemorrhage. This can be achieved by applying an absorbent dressing directly into a wound, thereby absorbing excess blood and creating a blockage, or by applying direct pressure with a hand or a tourniquet.

There can, however, be disastrous consequences when tamponade occurs as a result of health problems, as in the case of cardiac tamponade. In this situation, fluid collects inside the pericardial sac. The pressure within the pericardium prevents the heart from expanding fully and filling the ventricles, with the result that a significantly reduced amount of blood circulates within the body. If left unchecked, this condition will result in death eventually.

Bladder tamponade is obstruction of the urinary bladder outlet due to heavy blood clot formation within it. It generally requires surgery. Such heavy bleeding is usually due to bladder cancer.

Pressing bone wax into bleeding bone is considered hemostasis by tamponade, as opposed to methods which physically or biochemically activate the clotting cascade.

Gas tamponade has been used  for retinal detachment surgery, helping reduce the rate of fluid flow through retinal tears. Research suggests that patients undergoing surgery with tamponade agents of C3F8 gas and standard silicone oil had the best visual and anatomic outcomes, over other tamponade agents.

References

Medical treatments
Hematology